Xanthomonas albilineans is a species of bacteria.  It causes leaf scald in sugarcane and is the source of the phytoxin and antibiotic albicidin.

References

External links
Type strain of Xanthomonas albilineans at BacDive -  the Bacterial Diversity Metadatabase

Xanthomonadales
Bacteria described in 1943